Maritime Air Charter Limited is an on-demand aircraft charter company based at Halifax Stanfield International Airport in Enfield and Halifax Regional Municipality, Canada. It operates passenger and cargo services.

History 
Maritime Air Charter Limited began operations in July 1996 with a Piper Navajo and has had several fleet changes throughout the years, including operation of three PA-31 aircraft, a BN-2 Islander, and a BE10 King Air 100. It currently operates a Beechcraft 200 King Air purchased in 2012, C-GUND.

Fleet
As of September 18, the Maritime Air Charter fleet is a Super King Air 200.

References

External links

Maritime Air Charter Limited
Halifax Stanfield International Airport

Airlines established in 1996
Regional airlines of Atlantic Canada
1996 establishments in Nova Scotia
Companies based in Halifax, Nova Scotia
Charter airlines of Canada